Common stock is a form of corporate equity ownership, a type of security. The terms voting share and ordinary share are also used frequently outside of the United States. They are known as equity shares or ordinary shares in the UK and other Commonwealth realms.  This type of share gives the stockholder the right to share in the profits of the company, and to vote on matters of corporate policy and the composition of the members of the board of directors.

The owners of common stock do not own any particular assets of the company, which belong to all the shareholders in common. A corporation may issue both ordinary and preference shares, in which case the preference shareholders have priority to receive dividends. In the event of liquidation, ordinary shareholders receive any remaining funds after bondholders, creditors (including employees), and preference shareholders are paid. When the liquidation happens through bankruptcy, the ordinary shareholders typically receive nothing.

Since common stock is more exposed to the risks of the business than bonds or preferred stock, it offers a greater potential for capital appreciation. Over the long term, common stocks tend to outperform more secure investments, despite their short-term volatility.

Shareholder rights
Owners of a company's common stock have rights enumerated in its articles, bylaws and applicable corporate law. These can include the right to vote on directors, officers, compensation plans and major business actions such as acquisition or dissolution. Many companies also allow them to submit and vote on proposals to amend the bylaws or to mandate actions by the board. Pre-emption rights and shareholder rights plans regulate the terms under which new shareholders can affect the interests of existing ones. Shareholders have the right to request access to the company's financial records, the list of shareholders, and other records that they legitimately require to fulfill their ownership duties.

Classification
Common/Equity stock is classified to differentiate it from preferred stock. Each is considered a stock class, with different series of each issued from time to time such as Series B Preferred Stock. Nevertheless, using "Class B Common Stock" is a common label for a super-voting series of common stock.

See also
 Capital surplus
 Common stock dividend
 Equity (finance)
 Share capital
 Shares authorized
 Shares issued
 Shares outstanding
 Treasury stock

References

Stock market terminology
Equity securities
Corporate finance